EV Zug is a professional men's ice hockey team from Zug, Switzerland. It is a member of the National League and plays its home games at the Bossard Arena.

History
EV Zug won its first championship in the 1997–98 season, and the second one in the 2020-21 season.

On October 3, 2011, the club defeated the New York Rangers of the NHL by the score of 8-4 in an exhibition game. Former NHLer Josh Holden, who at the time was suspended from the NLA, was permitted to play and scored twice. He and Fabian Schnyder each had three points and Esa Pirnes also had two goals. Former Ranger goaltender Jussi Markkanen had the win in net in front of a sellout crowd at Bossard Arena.

Honors

Champions
NL Championship (3): 1998, 2021, 2022
Swiss Cup (1): 2019

Runners-up
NL Championship (4): 1995, 1997, 2017, 2019

Players

Current roster

NHL alumni

Ivan Hlinka  1983–85
Don "Red" Laurence  1989–91
Ken Yaremchuk  1990–96
Patrick Fischer  1992–97, 2003–06, 2007–09
Bill McDougall  1995–98
John Miner  1995–98
Wes Walz  1996–99
Paul DiPietro  1999–2004, 2005–11
Chris Tancill  1999–2004
Todd Elik  2000–02
James Black  2002–03
Raphael Diaz  2003–11, 2016–21
Claude Lemieux  2003–04
Mike Fisher  2004–05
Niko Kapanen  2004–05
Oleg Petrov  2004–08
Luca Sbisa  2006–07
Dale McTavish  2007–10
Reto Berra  2008–09
Damien Brunner  2008–13
Micki DuPont  2008–10
Josh Holden  2008–18
Andrei Bashkirov  2009–10
Jussi Markkanen  2009–13, 2016–17
Glen Metropolit  2010–12
Andy Wozniewski  2010–13
Timo Helbling  2011–13, 2016–18
Esa Pirnes  2011–12
Linus Omark  2012–13
Henrik Zetterberg  2012–13
Brian Boucher  2013–14
Robbie Earl  2013–15
Andrew Hutchinson  2013–14
Tim Ramholt  2013–16
Rob Schremp  2013–14
Kyle Wellwood  2013–14
Pierre-Marc Bouchard  2014–16
Tobias Stephan  2014–19
Michal Řepík  2014–15
Jarkko Immonen  2015–17
Carl Klingberg  2016–present
David McIntyre  2016–20
Garrett Roe  2017–19
Viktor Stålberg  2017–18
Dennis Everberg  2018–19

References

External links
 EV Zug official website

Ice hockey teams in Switzerland
Zug